Ejlinge is a small, currently uninhabited Danish island located close to Æbelø off the north coast of Funen,  north-east of Bogense. To the east the island is a glacial moraine whereas the western part consists of coastal meados with a rich bird life.

The western part of the island was under cultivation until 1994. There is a farmhouse on the island which was built in 1875. There is a house on the island. The island is connected to the Lindø peninsula by an approximately  tidal road.

See also
 List of islands of Denmark

References

Uninhabited islands of Denmark
Nordfyn Municipality